Modern Music is the fourth studio album by English rock band Be-Bop Deluxe. It was produced by band leader Bill Nelson and producer/engineer John Leckie. As AllMusic reviewer William Ruhlmann states in his review, "the album charted high in England and made the Top 100 in the U.S., but it was Be Bop's peak, not its breakthrough.

It was re-released in early 1991 with three bonus tracks. Q Magazine described the album as 'less impressive [with] convoluted poetical ramblings [and] indulgent twoddling'.

Track listing
 

 Sides one and two were combined as tracks 1–15 on CD reissues.

Personnel
Be-Bop Deluxe 
Bill Nelson - lead vocals, guitars, keyboards
Andrew Clark - keyboards 
Charlie Tumahai - bass, backing vocals 
Simon Fox - drums

Charts

References

1976 albums
Albums produced by John Leckie
Be-Bop Deluxe albums
Harvest Records albums